Bridgesia is a genus of flowering plants in the family Sapindaceae. The sole species, Bridgesia incisifolia, is a shrub native to South America in Chile.

Bridgesia W.J.Hooker & Arnott (a rejected name) is a synonym of the Phytolaccaceae genus Ercilla. Bridgesia Backeb. is an invalid synonym of the Cactaceae genus Rebutia.

References 

Chilebosque: Bridgesia incisifolia
Flora of Chile: Bridgesia (pdf file)

Index Nominum Genericorum (enter Bridgesia in search box)

Monotypic Sapindaceae genera
Sapindaceae
Flora of Chile